Mafuta Plamedi Buni Jorge (born 7 September 2000) is an Angolan professional footballer who plays as a midfielder for French club Créteil.

Club career
Buni Jorge began his senior career in 2017 with the reserves of Tours FC, and followed that up with stints at the reserves of Angers and Rodez. He made his professional debut with Rodez in a 2–0 Ligue 2 win over Niort on 23 October 2021.

On 31 January 2023, Buni Jorge transferred to Créteil in Championnat National 2.

References

External links
 
 

2000 births
Living people
Angolan footballers
Association football midfielders
Rodez AF players
Angers SCO players
Tours FC players
US Créteil-Lusitanos players
Ligue 2 players
Championnat National 2 players
Championnat National 3 players
Angolan expatriate footballers
Angolan expatriate sportspeople in France
Expatriate footballers in France